The St. Francis of Assisi Convent High School is a high school located in Navsari, Gujarat, India.

Started in 1963 this was the first English medium school in the district and offers GSEB courses up to grade 12 standard, the Higher Secondary (School) Certificate, in science and commerce streams
.

References

High schools and secondary schools in Gujarat
Christian schools in Gujarat
Catholic secondary schools in India
Education in Navsari district